Phoma microspora is a fungal plant pathogen known for infecting peanuts.

References

External links 
 Index Fungorum
 USDA ARS Fungal Database

Fungal plant pathogens and diseases
Peanut diseases
microspora